Hans Gram (1754-1804) was a Danish composer and musician who emigrated to the United States in the early 1780s. In Boston, Massachusetts, he served as organist of the Brattle Street Church, and as a music teacher. He lived in Charlestown; and in Boston on Belknap's Lane and Common Street. His music "was performed at the funeral of John Hancock." He died in Boston in 1804. In 1810 a "Hans Gram Musical Society" formed in Fryeburg, Maine.

Works
 Death Song of a Cherokee Indian. 1791
 (Compositions published in Massachusetts Magazine, ca.1791)
 Sacred Lines, for Thanksgiving Day
 Bind Kings with Chains, an anthem for Easter Sunday
  (Compiled and edited by Hans Gram, Samuel Holyoke and Oliver Holden).
 Hymn to Sleep. (Gram translated lyrics from German and added his verses)

References

Further reading
 "A Digraceful Practice." Boston Post; reprinted in: New Hampshire Gazette, 09-08-1846. Describes Gram drunk.
  Samuel Kirkland Lothrop. A history of the church in Brattle street, Boston. W. Crosby and H. P. Nichols, 1851. (Sermon #4, about Peter Thacher, describes the drama in 1790 of getting an organ).
 "Hans Gram." In:

External links
 WorldCat. Gram, Hans 1754-1804

1754 births
1804 deaths
Musicians from Boston
18th century in Boston
Musicians from Copenhagen
American male organists
American male composers
American composers
Cultural history of Boston
American organists